Talesh may refer to:

 Talesh County, in Gilan Province, Iran
 Talesh, Iran, a city and capital of the above county

See also
Talış (disambiguation)
Talish (disambiguation)
Talysh (disambiguation)